Proxmox may refer to:

 Proxmox Mail Gateway (PMG) - e-mail server management
 Proxmox Virtual Environment (PVE) - virtualization management 
 Proxmox Backup Server (PBS) - backup management